Who will pay for Luck is a 1980 Soviet action film directed by Konstantin Khudyakov.

Plot 
The film takes place in the Crimea in 1919. The White Guards are preparing a trial of the revolutionary Antonina Chumak. Sailor Kuskov, Cossack Dmitry Chumak and card cheater Fedor Chumar arrive in the city to save her.

Cast 
 Aleksandr Filippenko
 Vitali Solomin
 Leonid Filatov
 Natalya Danilova
 Oleg Afanasyev
 Vasiliy Bochkaryov
 Mikhail Chigaryov	
 V. Danilin
 Yuriy Dubrovin
 Aleksandr Galibin

References

External links 
 

1980 films
1980s Russian-language films
Soviet action films
1980 action films